
Gmina Boguty-Pianki is a rural gmina (administrative district) in Ostrów Mazowiecka County, Masovian Voivodeship, in east-central Poland.

Villages
Gmina Boguty-Pianki contains the villages and settlements of:
 
  Biale-Chorosze
  Biale-Figle
  Biale-Giezki
  Biale-Kwaczoly
  Biale-Misztale
  Biale-Papieze
  Biale-Szczepanowice
  Biale-Zieje
  Boguty-Augustyny
  Boguty-Lesne
  Boguty-Milczki
  Boguty-Pianki
  Boguty-Rubiesze
  Cietrzewki-Warzyno
  Drewnowo-Dmoszki
  Drewnowo-Golyn
  Drewnowo-Konarze
  Drewnowo-Lipskie
  Drewnowo-Ziemaki
  Godlewo-Backi
  Godlewo-Luby
  Kamienczyk Wielki
  Kamienczyk-Borowy
  Kamienczyk-Pierce
  Kamienczyk-Ryciorki
  Kraszewo-Czarne
  Kunin-Zamek
  Kutyłowo-Bródki
  Kutylowo-Perysie
  Michałowo-Wróble
  Murawskie-Czachy
  Murawskie-Miazgi
  Szpice-Chojnowo
  Trynisze-Kuniewo
  Trynisze-Moszewo
  Tymianki-Adamy
  Tymianki-Bucie
  Tymianki-Debosze
  Tymianki-Moderki
  Tymianki-Okunie
  Tymianki-Pacholy
  Tymianki-Skóry
  Tymianki-Szklarze
  Zabiele-Pikuly
  Zawisty-Dworaki
  Zawisty-Króle
  Zawisty-Kruki
  Zawisty-Piotrowice
  Zawisty-Wity
  Zlotki-Przeczki
  Zlotki-Pulapki 
  Zlotki-Starowies

Neighbouring gminas
Gmina Boguty-Pianki is bordered by the gminas of Ciechanowiec, Czyżew-Osada, Klukowo and Nur.

References

Polish official population figures 2006

Boguty-Pianki
Gmina Boguty Pianki